Brahms Museum may refer to:
 Brahms Museum (Hamburg), a museum in Hamburg, Germany
 Brahms House (Baden-Baden), a museum in Baden-Baden, Germany
 , a museum in Heide, Germany
 Brahms Museum, Mürzzuschlag, a museum in Mürzzuschlag, Austria